On November 7, 1978, Washington, D.C., held the second election for its mayor as a result of the District of Columbia Home Rule Act. The primary election of the Democratic Party (the most important contest in the race, as 90% of the District's voters were registered Democrats) took place on Tuesday, September 12, with At-Large Councilman Marion Barry defeating incumbent mayor Walter E. Washington and Council Chair Sterling Tucker to become the Democratic nominee for Mayor. Barry defeated Republican nominee Arthur Fletcher and two marginal candidates in the general election on November 7, 1978.

Campaign

Democratic primary
Walter Washington had been the last appointed head of the city, serving as Mayor-Commissioner under President Lyndon Johnson, before being elected DC's first home rule mayor. By 1978, though he still had the support of the city's unions, Washington was largely seen as a caretaker mayor who served to transition the city from federal oversight to local independence. Washington had appointed white politicians to his high-level administration positions, alienating the black majority who felt that blacks should run the city, and his position as a Johnson appointee raised suspicions that he was too closely tied to the city's former federal custodians.

D.C. Council Chair Sterling Tucker was the early favorite in the race. Like Washington, Tucker had been in Johnson's appointed DC government, the president's choice for council chair in 1967; previously he had been head of the DC chapter of the Urban League and was seen as a moderate crusader for civil rights. Tucker had the support of the city's black ministers, one of the most influential political blocs, and the business community.

Marion Barry, then incumbent as At-Large member of the DC Council, had come to the District in 1965 as head of the Student Nonviolent Coordinating Committee (SNCC), and had evolved into radical civil rights activism on the local DC level by the end of the 1960s, founding the activist group Pride, Inc. to provide employment for the city's poor black community. However, he had gained the support of the city's wealthy white liberal establishment and had begun to move through the city's public ranks when elected president of the school board in 1972, then to the Council two years later. Barry kept the white liberal support in his mayoral race, as well as that of the gay community, civil rights movement veterans, and the DC Board of Trade. However, he remained in third place until The Washington Post endorsed Barry on August 30, two weeks before the election.

On the September 12 primary, Barry beat Tucker by an extremely small margin of 1,400 votes, close enough that Tucker did not concede until after a recount had taken place. Incumbent Mayor Washington finished third, with just under 3,000 votes less than Barry.

General election
In the November general election, Barry faced Arthur Fletcher, an African-American Republican who had served as an Assistant Secretary in Richard Nixon's Department of Labor. Fletcher approached the race by accusing Barry of being the "white man's candidate," a tactic which The Washington Post criticized as "unforgivably shabby." On November 7, Barry won a landslide election with 70% of the vote.

Results

Democratic primary

General election

See also
Electoral history of Marion Barry

References

External links
Guide to the Marion Barry 1978 campaign oral history project, 1975-2018, Special Collections Research Center, Estelle and Melvin Gelman Library, The George Washington University.

1978
Washington
Mayoral
Washington, D.C.